Areca vestiaria (pinang yaki or pinang merah) is a species of palm native to the rainforests of eastern Indonesia especially North Sulawesi. Its morphology is more diverse than other species of palms, and in particular the color of its upper trunk / crownshaft changes depending on altitude (varying between red and orange).

The people of Sulawesi, near Bogani Nani Wartabone National Park, have long used the fruit of this palm as a male contraceptive. They drink a decoction of the fruit flesh boiled in water. The chemical composition of the fruit has been investigated with this in mind, but this does not represent evidence of its effectiveness as an antifertility agent.

References

vestiaria
Trees of the Maluku Islands
Trees of Sulawesi
Medicinal plants of Asia
Contraception for males